The Finnish Museum of Games is a museum dedicated to the history of Finnish games located in Vapriikki Museum Centre in Tampere, Finland. The museum exhibition consists of 100 Finnish games, six thematic period rooms, a video game arcade and a changing exhibition space. Overall, the museum has around 85 playable digital games.

The museum was created with the help of a crowdfunding campaign arranged in 2015. The crowdfunding campaign raised €85,860 from 1,120 backers. Major backers included game companies Supercell, Housemarque and Colossal Order.

In addition to digital games, the Finnish Museum of Games also collects and exhibits board games, card games, miniature games, roleplaying games and larps.

The museum opened in January 2017. By the end of June 2017, over 100,000 people had visited the museum.

Changing exhibitions have dealt with personal play histories, the role-playing convention Ropecon, the development of the virtual reality game P.O.L.L.E.N. and pixel art.

The Society for the History of Technology awarded the Finnish Museum of Games with the Dibner Award for Excellence in Museum Exhibits in 2018.

References

External links

Video game museums
2017 establishments in Finland
Museums established in 2017
Museums in Tampere